Hedmark Trafikk FKF is the public transport administration for bus transport in Hedmark, Norway and owned by the county administration. The company plans, markets and organises the public transport in Hedmark, but does not operate any buses itself. Instead it issues contracts to operating companies based on negotiated contracts.

All buses operated on contract for Hedmark Trafikk are uniformly painted yellow and Hedmark Trafikk takes care of marketing and customer relations for the bus companies. The companies that operate for Hedmark Trafikk are Østerdal Billag, Nordtrafikk, Norgesbuss, Nettbuss and Åmot og Engerdal Bilselskap.

External links
Hedmark Trafikk

Bus transport in Innlandet
Public transport administrators of Norway